Permas is a rural locality (a village) and the administrative center of Permasskoye Rural Settlement, Nikolsky District, Vologda Oblast, Russia. The population was 9 as of 2002.

Geography 
Permas is located 27 km south of Nikolsk (the district's administrative centre) by road. Brodovitsa is the nearest rural locality.

References 

Rural localities in Nikolsky District, Vologda Oblast